Presidential Administration of Iran (including Office of the President of Iran) consists of the immediate staff of the current President of Iran and multiple levels of support staff reporting to the President. It is located in Pasteur Street.

Chief
Chief of Staff of the President of Iran is a title referring to two different positions in Iranian government that may be held by one person: 
Head of President's Office 
Supervisor of Presidential Administration 
Both office-holders act as a senior aide to the President of Iran.

Gholam-Hossein Esmaeili holds Head of President's Office, since 2021 under President Ebrahim Raisi.

Mohsen Mansouri holds Supervisor of Presidential Administration, since 2022 under President Ebrahim Raisi.

Former Heads of President's Office 
 Mohammad Mirmohammadi under President Ali Khamenei
 Mohammad Mirmohammadi, Hossein Marashi and Mohsen Hashemi Rafsanjani under President Akbar Hashemi Rafsanjani
 Mohammad-Ali Abtahi and Ali Khatami under President Mohammad Khatami
 Gholam-Hossein Elham, Abdolreza Sheykholeslami, Esfandiar Rahim Mashaei and Mir-Hassan Mousavi under President Mahmoud Ahmadinejad
 Mohammad Nahavandian and Mahmoud Vaezi under President Hassan Rouhani

Former Supervisors of Presidential Administration 
 Mostafa Mir-Salim under President Ali Khamenei.
 Hassan Habibi under President Akbar Hashemi Rafsanjani
 Mohammad Hashemi Rafsanjani and Mohammad Reza Aref under President Mohammad Khatami
 Ali Saeedlou, Esfandiar Rahim Mashaei, Hamid Baghaei under President Mahmoud Ahmadinejad
 Mohammad Nahavandian and Mahmoud Vaezi under President Hassan Rouhani
 Sowlat Mortazavi under President Ebrahim Raisi

References

External links 
 

Political office-holders in Iran